Luther Loide Blissett  (born 1 February 1958) is a former professional footballer and manager who played for the England national team during the 1980s. Born in Jamaica, Blissett played as a striker, and is best known for his time at Watford, whom he helped win promotion from the Fourth Division to the First Division. As of 2022, Blissett holds Watford's all-time records for appearances and goals, having played 503 games and scored 186 goals.

Blissett's other clubs included A.C. Milan, who paid £1m for him in 1983 before selling him back to Watford for £550,000 in 1984, and AFC Bournemouth, for whom he had a goals-to-games ratio of nearly one goal in every two appearances. Blissett was capped 14 times by England, scoring a hat-trick on his debut. After retiring from playing, Blissett turned to coaching, initially under the management of Graham Taylor at Watford, and managed Chesham United from 2006 until 2007.

Since the mid-1990s, Luther Blissett has frequently been used as a pseudonym, most notably by members of the Luther Blissett Project.

Club career

Watford
Born in Falmouth, Jamaica, Blissett began his career with Watford as an apprentice on leaving school in the summer of 1974. He turned professional for the 1975–76 season, making three appearances in the Football League Fourth Division and scoring one goal. Four goalless appearances came in the 1976–77 season, before he broke into the first team under new manager Graham Taylor in 1977–78, when his six goals in 33 games helped Watford win promotion to the Football League Third Division. 21 goals the following campaign played a big part in a second successive promotion which took them into the Football League Second Division. He remained among the club's top goalscorers over the next three seasons as Watford consolidated in the Second Division and finally reached the First Division for the first time in their history in 1982, at the end of a season in which Blissett scored 19 league goals.

Blissett and his teammates made the headlines in the 1982–83 season as they surprised many by proving successful in the First Division. Watford briefly led the league in the autumn, before finishing second to Liverpool and qualified for the UEFA Cup. In Watford's first ever First Division season, Blissett was the division's top goalscorer that season with 27 goals.

A.C. Milan
He subsequently moved to A.C. Milan for £1 million in June 1983, but he was not as successful as he had been in England, scoring only five goals in 30 appearances. It has since been rumoured that A.C. Milan confused him with his Watford teammate John Barnes. However Italian football journalist Gabriele Marcotti believes this story is untrue. "There are two main reason for which I think it's not true," he says. "First, even the most ignorant and provincial person could see that Blissett and Barnes looked absolutely nothing alike. Second, the fact is that at that time Milan were looking for an out-and-out goalscorer and Barnes just wasn't that type of player." "No matter how much money you have here", Blissett famously complained about Italy, "you can't seem to get Rice Krispies," though he later claimed this was a joking response to what he considered a stupid question from a journalist.

Return to Watford
Blissett was sold back to Watford for £550,000 after one season with AC Milan. In his absence, Watford had reached their first FA Cup final, but lost to Everton, while new signing Mo Johnston was top scorer with 20 goals in the First Division.

On Blissett's return, Watford failed to achieve their successes of the previous two seasons, but survived another four seasons in the First Division. Blissett scored 21 goals in his first season back in the First Division, though the Hornets could only manage a mid table finish. He also helped them reach the FA Cup semi finals in 1986–87, but a year later they were relegated with Blissett scoring just four times in the league. He remained with the club until November 1988, when he signed for AFC Bournemouth.

Bournemouth
Blissett was successful at Dean Court, scoring 19 times from 30 league games in 1988–89 as the Cherries finished 10th in the Second Division, after emerging as surprise promotion contenders in only their second season at that level. He scored 18 goals in 1989–90, though a slump in the second half of the season dragged the Cherries down the table and on the last day of the season they were beaten at home by Leeds United in a result which gave the visitor's promotion as Second Division champions and relegated the Cherries to the Third Division. Undeterred, Blissett continued his fine form for Harry Redknapp's team, scoring 19 goals, though it wasn't enough to earn promotion at the end of the 1990–91 campaign.

Third spell at Watford
Blissett returned to Watford for a third spell at the start of the 1991–92 season. They were still in the Second Division, and his 10 goals in the league that season were not enough for Watford to look like promotion contenders, meaning that they would be founder members of the rebranded Division One – rather than the new FA Premier League – for the 1992–93 season. Blissett never played a first team game for Watford again, his only action in 1992–93 coming in shape of a three-match loan spell at West Bromwich Albion, which resulted in one Division Two goal.

Lower leagues
He ended his English league career in late 1993 with a five-match spell with Division Three club Mansfield Town (where he scored once) that had followed 10 games club Bury. After that came a five-match spell in the Football Conference at Southport, producing two goals, and four games and a goal for Derry City in the League of Ireland, before he finally retired from playing in 1995 after a season playing for Fakenham Town in the Eastern Counties Football League.

International career
Although born in Jamaica, Blissett was eligible to play for England having moved to the country at a young age. After making four appearances for England under-21s, Blissett became one of the first black footballers to play for the senior team. He scored a hat-trick on his full international debut – a 9–0 win over Luxembourg, in doing so becoming the first black player ever to score a hat-trick for England.
He never scored in any other international, however, despite playing for England a further 13 times.

Coaching career
He rejoined Watford as a coach in February 1996, coming in with returning manager Graham Taylor. He left the club in June 2001, following the appointment of Gianluca Vialli as manager. Vialli wanted to appoint his own backroom staff, and Blissett was among those deemed surplus to requirements. Taylor was publicly critical of the decision not to retain long-serving members of staff such as Blissett and Kenny Jackett.

In May 2002, he moved to York City to carry out a coaching role. He later left that post and on 15 February 2006 was appointed manager of Southern League team Chesham United, which he even made two appearances for as a substitute. However, in April 2007, it was announced that Blissett would leave Chesham at the end of the season to concentrate on his involvement with the Windrush Motorsport project, which aimed to enter the Le Mans 24-hour race.

On 27 March 2010, it was confirmed that Blissett had signed to Hemel Hempstead Town as a coach.

In the summer of 2016, Blissett was appointed Director of Football at Burnham, briefly serving as caretaker after the departures of both Dave Tuttle and Gifton Noel-Williams.

Personal life and cultural impact
Blissett has worked as a television pundit for Channel 4 and Bravo's coverage of Serie A.

With fellow former Watford and England footballers John Barnes and Les Ferdinand, he founded Team48 Motorsport; a team aiming to promote young racing drivers of Afro-Caribbean background. In 2008, Blissett entered a team into the British Touring Car Championship, aiming to run Alfa Romeos for white Jamaican Matthew Gore and 18-year-old black Briton Darelle Wilson. However, the project never got off the starting line and the team failed to show up for any of the races.

Soccer A.M., a football magazine programme on Sky Sports, refers to the area where 'fans of the week' sit as the 'Luther Blissett Stand'.

In 2011, Blissett took part in a celebrity motor race at the 2011 Silverstone Classic. He had a large crash on the opening lap, rolling the car several times. He was unhurt. Rick Parfitt Jnr won the race, with Heston Blumenthal second and Brendan Cole third. They were all raising money for the Bobby Moore fund for Cancer Research. From 2014, Blissett was racing an Alfa 156 in the BRSCC Alfashop Alfa Romeo Championship.

Blissett was appointed Officer of the Order of the British Empire (OBE) in the 2022 Birthday Honours for services to association football and charity.

Blissett and the "Luther Blissett Project"

Blissett's name has been adopted by many people in radical activist circles as a nom de plume or collective alias when engaged in unusual performances, situationist pranks, media hoaxes, and the production of radical theory. The Luther Blissett multiple name project first began in 1994 in Italy, no doubt a consequence of his link with A.C. Milan, and has since then been widely used by artists, underground reviews, poets, performers and squatters' collectives in cities throughout Europe and South America. In 1999 "Luther Blissett" authored a historical novel called Q, which sold hundreds of thousands of copies in over ten languages.

On 30 June 2004, the real Luther Blissett took part in the British television sports show Fantasy Football League – Euro 2004, broadcast on ITV. He jokingly claimed that he himself was part of the Luther Blissett Project, and read aloud the following sentence from an LBP manifesto (in Italian): "Chiunque può essere Luther Blissett, semplicemente adottando il nome Luther Blissett" [Anyone can be Luther Blissett simply by adopting the name Luther Blissett].

Career statistics

Honours
 He was awarded the Freedom of the Borough of Watford on 10 March 2021.

 He was appointed as a Deputy Lieutenant of Hertfordshire in July 2021.
 He was awarded an OBE in June 2022.

See also
 List of England international footballers born outside England

Notes

References

External links
A Translated Interview with Luther Blissett from Italian Daily Newspaper L'Unità, followed by a comment from Wu Ming, the writers formerly known as the "Luther Blissett Project".
BBC Sport article

1958 births
Living people
English footballers
England under-21 international footballers
England B international footballers
England international footballers
Watford F.C. players
A.C. Milan players
AFC Bournemouth players
West Bromwich Albion F.C. players
Bury F.C. players
Mansfield Town F.C. players
Derry City F.C. players
Watford F.C. non-playing staff
English Football League players
First Division/Premier League top scorers
League of Ireland players
Serie A players
English beach soccer players
English football managers
Expatriate footballers in Italy
English expatriate footballers
Wimborne Town F.C. players
Fakenham Town F.C. players
Chesham United F.C. players
Chesham United F.C. managers
English people of Jamaican descent
Association football forwards
English expatriate sportspeople in Italy
Jamaican emigrants to the United Kingdom
Deputy Lieutenants of Hertfordshire
York City F.C. non-playing staff
Officers of the Order of the British Empire